Massagris mohale is a jumping spider species in the genus Massagris that lives in Lesotho. It was first identified in 2014.

References

Salticidae
Spiders described in 2014
Spiders of Africa
Fauna of Lesotho